The East Brighton Football Netball Club is an Australian rules football and netball club located in the southern suburbs of Melbourne.

The club, nicknamed The Vampires, was established in 1948, joining the Caulfield District Football League that year.

The club was a founding member of the South East Suburban Football League in 1963 and of the Southern Football League in 1992 where the club currently competes in the first division.

East Brighton played its first four years at Dendy Park before relocating to its current home at Hurlingham Park in 1952.

East Brighton is closely associated with the East Brighton Vampires Junior Football Club who field junior teams from Under 9s through to Under 18s. These teams compete in the South Metropolitan Junior Football League.

Senior Premierships
 South East Suburban Football League
 1966, 1973, 1976, 1988 (Division 2), 1991
 Southern Football League
 1993, 2002 (Division 2), 2004, 2012, 2014

References

External links
 Official website

Australian rules football clubs in Melbourne
Southern Football League (Victoria)
1948 establishments in Australia
Australian rules football clubs established in 1948
Sport in the City of Bayside